This is a list of the baronies of Ireland.  Baronies were subdivisions of counties, mainly cadastral but with some administrative functions prior to the Local Government (Ireland) Act 1898.

Final list
A figure of 273 is also quoted, by combining those divided into half-baronies, as by East/West, North/South, or Upper/Middle/Lower divisions.

Every point in Ireland is in precisely one of the listed divisions. However, the municipal area of the four cities with barony status in 1898 has extended since then into the surrounding baronies. Prior to 1898, the baronies around Dublin City were shrunk accordingly as they ceded land to the expanding city; but there is now land which is both within the current city boundaries and within one of the pre-1898 county baronies. Notably, the Barony of Dublin, created in 1842, is entirely within the city, although still separate from the Barony of Dublin City.

Creation date is sometimes specified as an upper bound (and possibly a lower bound) rather than the precise year:
 "1542"/"By 1542": Barony created/listed in the Act which divided counties Meath and Westmeath.
"By 1574" indicates baronies in Connacht and Thomond (Clare) listed in 1574.
"By 1593" indicates baronies in the Pale represented at a 1593 militia hosting at the Hill of Tara.
"By 1598" indicates baronies in County Kerry listed on the map of the Desmond or Clancarthy Survey of 1598.
"By 1603" indicates baronies in County Fermanagh recorded by the commission which met on Devenish Island in July 1603.
"By 1609" indicates baronies included in maps of the escheated counties of Ulster (made in 1609, reprinted by the Ordnance Survey in 1861).
"By 1672" indicates baronies depicted in Hiberniae Delineatio, "Perry's Atlas", engraved in 1671-2 by William Petty from the data of the Down Survey. This delimited all, and described most, of the baronies then extant.  Many of these baronies had existed since the late 16th century.
"By 1792" indicates baronies listed in 1792 in Memoir of a map of Ireland by Daniel Beaufort.
"Divided by 1821" indicates where a single barony in Hiberniae Delineatio corresponds to two (half-)baronies in the 1821 census data. These divisions had been effected by varying statutory means in the intervening decades.

Notes:

Former baronies
The names of more recently abolished baronies are generally preserved in the successor baronies; e.g. "Massereene" was split into "Massereene Lower" and "Massereene Upper", and "Coshmore" and "Coshbride" were merged into Coshmore and Coshbride.

The Municipal Corporations (Ireland) Act 1840 (3 & 4 Vict. c.108)  separated the rural hinterland or "liberties" from some of the counties corporate, restricting their jurisdiction to the relevant municipal town, borough, or city. The Counties and Boroughs (Ireland) Act 1840 (3 & 4 Vict. c.109) provided that the rural area would form a new barony of the adjacent county until the county Grand Jury should decide to allocate it to an existing barony. The reallocation happened quickly in some cases, slower in others, and not at all in three cases: the baronies of Cork and Galway, and the Louth barony of Drogheda.

The "half barony of Varbo" shown between Trughanacmy and Corkaguiny on the map of the Desmond or Clancarthy Survey of 1598 may correspond to the medieval cantred of Uí Fearba / Hy Ferba / "Offariba otherwise Arbowe", which comprised the castle and lands of Listrim and Ballinoe.

A barony of Drogheda in County Meath is listed in the 1841 and 1851 censuses. The territory included is the portion of the County of the Town of Drogheda outside the municipal borough of Drogheda and south of the River Boyne; this was detached from the County of the Town under the 1840 Act.  However, the Local Government (Drogheda and Meath) Act 1845 first recites that this area was in fact transferred to County Louth under the 1840 Act (as part of the Louth barony of Drogheda) and then goes on to transfer the land to County Meath as part of Lower Duleek barony.

See also
List of Irish local government areas 1898–1921
List of Baronies and Civil Parishes of County Wicklow

References
 
 
 
 
 
 
  Vol. I: A–C, Vol. II: D–M, Vol. III: N–Z

Notes

Irish names
Irish names have all been referenced from the 2008 Placenames Database of Ireland, published by the Department of Culture, Heritage and the Gaeltacht of the Government of Ireland:

External links

 Itineraries for Irish Topographical Botany includes large JPGs of the county maps from Robert Lloyd Praeger's copy of Philips' Handy Atlas of the Counties of Ireland (c.1880) with baronies clearly differentiated by colour and border.
 Barony Map of Ireland by Dennis Walsh
 Alphabetical List of Baronies in Northern Ireland Public Record Office of Northern Ireland
 2011 Census Boundaries, including shapefiles for baronies; from the Central Statistics Office, Ireland

 
Ireland geography-related lists
Lists of former subdivisions of countries
Lists of subdivisions of Ireland